Andrew Phillip Chambers (June 30, 1931 – June 3, 2017) was a lieutenant general in the United States Army. An alumnus of the Howard University, he was a commanding general of the VII Corps and the United States Army Central in the 1980s. He received a B.S. degree in physical education from Howard University in 1954 and later earned an M.S. degree in communications from Shippensburg State College. The then Major General Chambers commanded the 1st Cavalry Division at Fort Hood, Texas, between July 1982 and June 1984. He also was director of the Army Equal Opportunity Program. His brother, Lawrence Chambers, an alumnus of the United States Naval Academy, was a rear admiral in the United States Navy. He and his brother are the first black siblings to hold flag ranks in the United States Military. After his death, Chambers was interred at Arlington National Cemetery on October 18, 2017.

References

1931 births
2017 deaths
People from Bedford, Virginia
Howard University alumni
United States Army personnel of the Vietnam War
Recipients of the Soldier's Medal
Shippensburg University of Pennsylvania alumni
Recipients of the Legion of Merit
United States Army generals
Recipients of the Defense Superior Service Medal
Recipients of the Distinguished Service Medal (US Army)
Burials at Arlington National Cemetery